Malyye Klestyata is a rural locality (a village) in Lobanovskoye Rural Settlement, Permsky District, Perm Krai, Russia. The population was 34 as of 2010. There are 2 streets.

Geography 
Malyye Klestyata is located 22 km south of Perm (the district's administrative centre) by road. Klestyata is the nearest rural locality.

References 

Rural localities in Permsky District